The A432 is a road running from Bristol to Old Sodbury. The road is mostly single carriageway with one lane each way, with a short dual carriageway section in the east of Yate.

History
The A432 was originally classified in 1922 and the route has remained unchanged since. In 1966 the construction of the M4 required a bridge to be built, and a roundabout was built to connect the road to the A4174 in the early 90s. The section of dual carriageway was mostly 2 lanes each way in 1999, but over the next 20 years it was gradually downgraded to one lane each way.

Route
The road starts near Lawrence Hill in Bristol on the A420 and heads North-East, where it intersects the A4320. It continues to Downend, passing Easton and Fishponds, where it has three junctions with the A4017 before heading north to a roundabout with the A4174. After the roundabout it goes north over the M4 and heads North-East to Yate, and once it reaches it the road splits into a dual carriageway until it gets to Chipping Sodbury. The road heads East out of Chipping Sodbury and continues that way until it terminates at the A46.

See also
 British road numbering scheme
 A roads in Zone 4 of the Great Britain numbering scheme

References

Roads in England
Roads in Bristol
Transport in Gloucestershire